Marshall Scot Allman (born April 5, 1984) is an American actor. He is known to television audiences for his role as L. J. Burrows on the Fox television series Prison Break. He is also known for playing Tommy Mickens on True Blood.

Early life
Allman was born in Austin, Texas, brother of David Allman, and the son of Idanell (née Brown; born January 14, 1950; Austin, Texas) and James Martin Allman, Jr. (born April 27, 1950; Travis County, Texas). As he grew up he was talented in soccer and art. Allman played club and school soccer and is deeply interested in contemporary music. After graduating from Austin High School in 2002, he chose to pursue an acting career in Los Angeles over studying art in New York City. Allman is a Christian, and in an interview he stated, "Any time someone tries to represent their idea of God it's paramount to remember that you're an imperfect person leading a flawed life."

Personal life
Allman married American actress Jamie Anne Allman ( Brown) of Parsons, Kansas on June 17, 2006, in Austin, Texas. They have twins who were born in 2013.

Career
Allman has also made guest appearances on shows such as Without a Trace, Boston Public, Malcolm in the Middle, The Practice, Law & Order: Special Victims Unit, Phil of the Future, Close to Home, Cold Case, Saving Grace, Eli Stone, Grey's Anatomy, Mad Men, Bates Motel, and The Closer. In November 2009, Allman won the role of Tommy Mickens in the third season of True Blood. Allman has also done voice over work, such as on Breathe Bible. Allman's film credits include Shallow Ground, Little Black Book, Dishdogz and The Immaculate Conception of Little Dizzle.

Filmography

Films

Television

Guest

Telefilm

Video games

Short

Music videos
 Drowning by Crazy Town from the album Darkhorse, 2002

References

External links

Marshall Allman Online Fansite

1984 births
Living people
American male film actors
American male television actors
Austin High School (Austin, Texas) alumni
Male actors from Austin, Texas
21st-century American male actors
American male video game actors